Events in the year 1868 in Spain.

Incumbents
Monarch - Isabella II until September 30

Events
September 19–27 - Glorious Revolution (Spain)

Births

Deaths
April 23 - Ramón María Narváez, 1st Duke of Valencia

 
1860s in Spain